Kalarcode or Kalarkode is a village in Alappuzha district,  from the town of Alappuzha. The village name derives from Kalyakroda Vilasam.

Demographics
As of the 2001 Census of India, Kalarkode had a population of - with - males and - females.

Education
Sanatana Dharma College is situated here, as are the Alappuzha centre of the Institute of Management in Kerala and the Kerala University Study centre.

Transportation
Kalarkode have connections with Alappuzha, Eranakulam, Changanassery and other parts of Kerala through a well-connected network of roads & rail. The Alappuzha - Changanassery state highway (AC Road) starts at Kalarkode. The construction of Alappuzha Bypass starting from Kalarkode at the south end to set apart National Highway 66 (Old NH 47) crisscrossing through the bustling Alappuzha city heart is underway construction at a rapid pace.

Nearby places
Ambalapuzha
Alappuzha
Champakulam
Cherthala
Haripad
Sanathanapuram

Administration
The village is part of Ambalapuzha state assembly constituency for state elections. That in turn is part of the Alappuzha Lok Sabha constituency for national elections.

Religion
The Major Mahadeva temple is an important place of worship in this area.

References

Villages in Alappuzha district